Amiel is both a surname and a given name. Notable people with the name include:

Surname:
 Barbara Amiel (born 1940), writer and wife of Conrad Black
 Gausbert Amiel (fl. 13th century), troubadour
 Henri-Frédéric Amiel (1821–1881), Swiss philosopher, poet and critic
 Jack Amiel (fl. 20th–21st century), American screenwriter
 Jon Amiel (born 1948), British director
 Stephanie Amiel (born 1954), British physician and academic
 Thierry Amiel (born 1982), French singer

Given name:
 Amiel Daemion (born 1979), American-Australian pop singer